
Lac de Bret is a lake in the municipality of Puidoux, in the canton of Vaud, Switzerland. It is located north of Lake Geneva. The natural lake is used as a drinking water reservoir for the city of Lausanne. The first dam was built 1875 to supply water for the Lausanne-Ouchy funicular.

See also
List of lakes of Switzerland

External links

L'eau potable du lac de Bret 
Hiking around the lake 
Fishing on Lac de Bret 

Lakes of the canton of Vaud
Lakes of Switzerland